Ornella Vanoni  (born 22 September 1934) is an Italian singer-songwriter and actress. She is one of the longest-standing Italian artists, having started performing in 1956. She has released about 112 works between LP, EPs and greatest hits albums, and is considered one of the most popular interpreters of Italian pop music. During her long career she has sold over 65 million records.

Artistic career
Vanoni started her artistic career in 1960 as a theatre actress. She mostly performed in Bertolt Brecht works, under the direction of Giorgio Strehler at his Piccolo Teatro in Milan. At the same time, she started a music career. The folklore and popular songs she explored in her early records, especially the ones about the criminal underworld in Milan, resulted in her receiving the nickname  ("Underworld Singer").

Vanoni scored two major hits in 1963 with "Senza Fine" and "Che cosa c'è", both written for her by Gino Paoli. In 1964 she won the Festival of Neapolitan song with "Tu si na cosa grande". In the following years, she took part in a series of Festivals of Italian song in San Remo with the songs "Abbracciami forte" (1965), "Io ti darò di più" (1966), "La musica è finita" (1967), "Casa Bianca" (1968), and "Eternità" (1970). "Casa Bianca", which finished second in 1968, was the subject of a copyright dispute between the composer of the song, Don Backy, and the Clan Celentano label.

In the late 1960s, Vanoni recorded "Una ragione di più", "Un'ora sola ti vorrei", "L'appuntamento" (a cover of the Brazilian song "Sentado à Beira do Caminho" by Erasmo Carlos and Roberto Carlos) and "Non Dirmi Niente", a cover of Burt Bacharach's "Don't Make Me Over". In 1972 she sang "Quei giorni insieme a te", the theme from Lucio Fulci's critically acclaimed mystery thriller film Don't Torture a Duckling.

In 1976, Vanoni collaborated with Vinicius de Moraes and Toquinho on the song "La voglia, la pazzia, l'incoscienza e l'allegria". During the 1980s, she released "Ricetta di donna", "Uomini", and "Ti lascio una canzone" (with Gino Paoli). In 1989, she returned to the Sanremo Music Festival with the song "Io come farò". In 1999, she recorded "Alberi", a duet with Enzo Gragnaniello. In 2004 she released an album of duets with Paoli to celebrate her 70th birthday.

In addition to her music career, Ornella Vanoni was active in other creative fields, starring in stage and TV shows, movies. In January 1977 she posed nude for the Italian edition of Playboy magazine. The inclusion of her song "L'Appuntamento" (1970) in the soundtrack of Steven Soderbergh's Ocean's Twelve in 2004 sparked a worldwide renewal of interest in her music.

Discography 

Ornella Vanoni (1961)
Caldo (1965)
Ornella (1966)
Ornella Vanoni (1967)
Ai miei amici cantautori (1968)
Io si - Ai miei amici cantautori n°2 (1969)
Ah! L'amore l'amore quante cose fa fare l'amore (1971)
Un gioco senza età (1972)
Dettagli (1973)
Ornella Vanoni e altre storie (1973)
A un certo punto (1973)
La voglia di sognare (1974)
Quei giorni insieme a te (1974)
Uomo mio, bambino mio (1975)
La voglia, la pazzia, l'incoscienza, l'allegria (1976)
Più (1976)
Io dentro (1977)
Io fuori (1977)
Vanoni (1978)
Oggi le canto così, vol.1 (1979)
Oggi le canto così, vol.2 (1980)
Ricetta di donna (1980)
Duemilatrecentouno parole (1981)
Oggi le canto così, vol.3 (1982)
Oggi le canto così, vol.4 (1982)
Uomini (1983)
Insieme (1985, live with Gino Paoli)
Ornella &... (1986)
O (1987)
Il giro del mio mondo (1989)
Quante storie (1990)
Stella nascente (1992)
Io sono come sono... (1995)
Sheherazade (1995)
Argilla (1997)
Adesso (1999)
Un panino una birra e poi... (2001)
...e poi la tua bocca da baciare (2001)
 I concerti live @RTSI: Ornella Vanoni 5 Maggio 1982 (2001, live from a tv show)
Sogni proibiti (2002)
Noi, le donne noi (2003)
Ti ricordi? No non mi ricordo (2004, with Gino Paoli)
Più di me (2008, duets album) (ITA: 3× platinum)
Più di te (2009, duets album) (ITA: gold)
Meticci (Io mi fermo qui) (2013)
Un pugno di stelle (2018) 
Unica (2021)

Filmography

References

Much of the content of this article comes from the equivalent Italian-language Wikipedia article (retrieved 28 March 2006).

1934 births
Living people
Singers from Milan
20th-century Italian women singers
21st-century Italian women singers